Lasiopetalum lineare is a species of flowering plant in the family Malvaceae and is endemic to the south-west of Western Australia. It is an erect shrub with densely hairy young stems, linear leaves and bright pink and dark red flowers.

Description
Both surfaces of the leaves are covered with white and rust-coloured, star-shaped hairs. Flowering occurs from August to November.

Taxonomy
Lasiopetalum lineare was first formally described in 1974 by Susan Paust in the journal Nuytsia from specimens collected by Robert Royce near Watheroo in 1954. The specific epithet (lineare) means "linear", referring to the leaves.

Distribution and habitat
This lasiopetalum grows in woodland or heath between Gingin and Eneabba in the Geraldton Sandplains and Swan Coastal Plain biogeographic regions of south-western Western Australia.

Conservation status
Lasiopetalum lineare is listed as "not threatened" by the Government of Western Australia Department of Biodiversity, Conservation and Attractions.

References

lineare
Malvales of Australia
Rosids of Western Australia
Plants described in 1974